Bethsaida is a Biblical location

Bethsaida may also refer to:

Bethsaida Valley
Bethsaida Community Foundation

See also
 Bethesda (disambiguation)